Christian Catalini is a co-creator of Diem (formerly Libra), the Chief Economist of the Diem Association, and the Theodore T. Miller Professor at the MIT Sloan School of Management.

Catalini is known for his research on the economics of cryptocurrencies and blockchain technology, and for the economical design of Diem. His past research focused on the economics of crowdfunding, early stage capital formation, the economics of science and technology.

Career 

Catalini joined the faculty of MIT in 2013, and was appointed in 2018 as Faculty Research Fellow at the National Bureau of Economic Research in the Productivity, Innovation and Entrepreneurship Program.

In 2013, Catalini co-designed with Catherine Tucker the MIT Digital Currency Experiment that distributed $500,000 in Bitcoin to all MIT undergraduates. Catalini and Tucker published the results of their research study in Science.

In 2017, Catalini founded the MIT Cryptoeconomics Lab, which brings together the fields of economics and computer science to study cryptocurrency protocols, their incentives and market design. Catalini is also a faculty advisor to the MIT Digital Currency Initiative (on leave), and an economic advisor to Algorand, a cryptocurrency startup founded by Silvio Micali.

In 2018, Catalini joined David Marcus' team at Facebook, Inc. to develop the economical design of Libra (now Diem). Since 2020, he is seconded to the Diem Association as its Chief Economist. At Diem, Catalini is focused on the economic, market design, growth incentives, and business model of the project.

In 2022, Catalini joined Coinbase Institute and sits on the Advisory Board.

Education 

Christian Catalini was born in Ancona, Italy. He studied economics and business at Bocconi University in Milan (B.Sc. and M.Sc.). In 2013, Catalini earned a Ph.D. degree from the University of Toronto (Rotman School of Management) for research supervised by Ajay Agrawal. During his Ph.D., Catalini worked with Ajay Agrawal to establish the Creative Destruction Lab (CDL) at the University of Toronto, served as its Associate Director (2012-2013), and then as a member of the CDL Strategic Advisory Board (2013-2018). Since 2019, he is an Associate in the Creative Destruction Lab Blockchain Stream.

Research 

Catalini is best known for some of his fundamental early work on the economics of cryptocurrencies and blockchain technology, crowdfunding, early stage capital formation, and the economics of science. His research on these topics has been featured in Nature, Science, the New York Times, CNN, the Wall Street Journal, the Economist, CNBC, WIRED, NPR, Forbes, Bloomberg, TechCrunch, the Financial Times, the Chicago Tribune, the Boston Globe, VICE news, the Washington Post, and Reuters among others.

In 2017, Catalini received the Ewing Marion Kauffman Foundation Junior Faculty Fellowship in Entrepreneurship Research. In 2014, Catalini's thesis was awarded the Wiley Blackwell Outstanding Dissertation Award in Business Policy and Strategy for “Three Essays on the Impact of Geographic and Social Proximity on Innovation”, assigned by the Business Policy and Strategy division of the Academy of Management.

Catalini has presented his work at a variety of institutions including Harvard University, MIT, Yale University, London Business School, New York University, UC Berkeley, Stanford University, the Council on Foreign Relations, the Federal Reserve Bank, the Federal Trade Commission, the US Treasury, the U.S. Securities and Exchange Commission, the Commodity Futures Trading Commission, the World Bank, the International Monetary Fund, the World Economic Forum, the White House OSTP, and a number of central banks and US and global regulators.

References 

Cryptocurrencies
Living people
University of Toronto alumni
Bocconi University alumni
Year of birth missing (living people)